Florian Ambru (born 1928) was a Romanian football defender and manager. On 21 November 1948 he played in the first ever CSCA București - Dinamo București derby.

International career
Florian Ambru appeared in one friendly game at international level for Romania, under coach Emerich Vogl in a 6–0 victory against Albania played at the Republic stadium, Bucharest.

Honours

Manager
FCM Bacău
Divizia B: 1955

References

External links
Florian Ambru player profile at Labtof.ro
Florian Ambru manager profile at Labtof.ro

1928 births
Romanian footballers
Romania international footballers
Association football defenders
Liga I players
Liga II players
FC Dinamo București players
FCM Bacău players
Romanian football managers
FCM Bacău managers
CSM Ceahlăul Piatra Neamț managers
Possibly living people